This is a list of baronetcies in the Baronetage of the United Kingdom. They have been created since 1801, when they replaced the baronetages of Baronetage of Great Britain and Baronetage of Ireland. This list is not currently complete.

A

B

C

D

E

F

G

H

I

J

K

L

M

N

O

P

R

S

T

U–V

W

Y

See also
Baronet
List of baronetcies in the Baronetage of Ireland
List of baronetcies in the Baronetage of Nova Scotia
List of baronetcies in the Baronetage of England
List of baronetcies in the Baronetage of Great Britain
List of extant Baronetcies

External links
Baronetcies to which no Succession has been proved

References

United Kingdom
Baronetcies